The academic dress of McGill University describes the caps, gowns and hoods which are prescribed by the university for its degree candidates/holders. Until the mid-20th century, McGill also prescribed academic dress for its matriculating or enrolled students as well as its faculty. Founded in 1821, McGill University is consistently ranked as one of Canada's preeminent universities, and among the top 20 universities in the world.

History

Academic regalia has been part of university life at McGill since it started offering classes in the 1820s at its historic Montreal campus on the flank of Mount Royal. It predates the codification of academic regalia in the United States through the Intercollegiate Code of Academic Costume that most American colleges and universities adopted in the late 1890s. Until the 1930s, McGill observed the British tradition of requiring its faculty and students to be attired in academic robes for classes and lectures, "except in those cases in which a dispensation shall have been granted by the faculty." McGill's renowned political economy professor, Stephen Leacock, is often remembered for his black, tattered robe that "had grown greenish with age," but which he wore to the classroom without fail each day, raising concerns among his fellow professors and students that it could one day cause him injury.

Academic regalia at McGill was traditionally differentiated in accordance with the wearer's status and degree. Matriculating undergraduates had to attend classes in "plain, black stuff gown, not falling below the knee, with round sleeve cut above the elbow". Graduating students for the bachelor's degree, on the other hand, wore robes falling below their knees with full sleeves cut to the elbow, and black hoods lined in silk which were edged with white rabbit fur. Master's degree candidates/holders wore the same black gown as the bachelor's, with the masters' sleeves appearing in semi-circular cut toward the bottom. Doctors of Philosophy (Ph.D.s), Science, Literature, and Civil Law wore the university's scarlet full dress. The doctoral full dress was the equivalent of the academic dress of the University of Cambridge for its higher doctorates, rather than for its Ph.D.s. It was originally made of scarlet cloth, "faced with silk of the same colour as the lining of their respective hoods." The turned-back, full sleeves of the McGill doctoral dress were also lined up with silk in the same colour that denoted the wearer's field of study. Doctorate and master's hoods were identical in form. They were distinguished from the bachelor hoods by the former's scarlet colour, greater length and absence of rabbit fur. McGill University's official colour is scarlet.

Faculty and matriculating students at McGill in the 19th and early 20th centuries did not have to wear caps and hoods to classes and lectures. The bachelor's and master's caps for commencement and other formal ceremonies were of the mortarboard-style or the square academic cap described in university bulletins or "calendars" as "the ordinary black trencher with black tassel." In contrast, doctoral degree holders wore the black, velvet Tudor bonnet or tam associated with the University of Cambridge's full doctoral dress. Ribboned together around the McGill bonnet's crown were two gold strand tassels.

Current regulations for academic dress

Academic dress at McGill has not changed much since written regulations were first issued in the 1840s. Only three notable changes have evolved since that time. The first was the removal of the academic dress requirements for faculty and students during classes and lectures starting in the mid-1930s. Academic dress is currently worn only at commencement and special convocations, such as the installations of the university's principal and chancellor and the inauguration of endowed chairs. A second development was the identification and codification of the colours of silk linings to denote the wearer's field of study. This became necessary as McGill offered more and newer fields in its curriculum, such as nutrition, physical therapy, occupational therapy and urban planning, particularly since the 1960s. A third innovation was the option, introduced in 2001, of wearing the scarlet Ph.D. regalia partly closed-front and hooked, which departs from the totally open-gown style of the University of Cambridge full dress for its Ph.D.s and higher doctorates.

Current regulations for donning academic regalia at McGill ceremonies are summarized below:
Non-degree certificate and diploma: Black gown, without any hood, unless the wearer has previously obtained a degree.
Bachelor: Black Bachelor gown with large sleeves to the wrist, black hood bordered with white fur and lined with the distinctive colour of the degree, and mortarboard cap.
Master: Black Master gown with sleeves that have a square slit just below the shoulder and a long flat sleeve to below the knee, black hood without the fur border but lined with the distinctive colour of the degree, and mortarboard cap.
Doctorate, other than Ph.D. (e.g., M.D., C.M. and D.M.D.): Black Master gown, hood of scarlet cloth lined with the distinctive colours of the degree, and mortarboard cap.
Ph.D.: Scarlet gown with pale green facing, hood lined in pale green silk, and Tudor bonnet.
Honorary doctorate: The Ph.D. scarlet gown, with facing and hood silk lining in the colour of the field of honor, and Tudor bonnet.

In addition, designated university convocation marshals wear grey ceremonial gowns and hoods lined in scarlet and Tudor bonnets at convocations and other formal ceremonies.

Colours of hood linings

Current regulations prescribe that the colour(s) of silk linings for McGill hoods shall represent the field/faculty of the wearer. The same colour(s) shall apply to the silk facings and reversed-sleeve linings of the McGill Ph.D. robes.

Materials

McGill academic gowns were traditionally made of woolen stuff, Russell cord or (in the case of some of its faculty and officials) silk. Among the oldest existing McGill regalia is a complete set from 1864 consisting of a black mortarboard, black woolen gown and a hood "of scarlet wool lined with silk." Originally worn by a graduating student from McGill's Faculty of Medicine, it remains on permanent display at the McCord Museum in Montreal.

Today's McGill robes are made from synthetic fiber like most other university robes, which has reduced the cost of purchasing them. Pilgrim fabric is used for the university's formal scarlet gown for its Ph.D.s. McGill hood linings for all degrees and degree levels, which were originally cut out of silk, are presently made of synthetic art silk. Rabbit fur has been discontinued for the bachelors' hoods. Instead, artificial fur (or faux-fur) has been used since the late 1990s.

The mortarboards worn for bachelor's and master's degrees are also presently made from black synthetic fiber. The Tudor bonnets or tams of the Ph.D.s are in black velvet with their oblong-shaped brim appropriately hard-backed.

University officials

The distinctive robes worn by McGill University's chancellor, principal, and chair of the board of directors (who could also be the chancellor) are variants of the university's master's gown, with its square slit below the shoulders.

The chancellor's robe features gold trims and facings. The principal's trims and facings are in silvery-white. As the university's chief executive, the sleeves of the principal's robe are also embroidered with the university's coat of arms.

University officials' robes are worn open and without hoods. Their black caps are either velvet mortarboards or Tudor bonnets, both of which are adorned with thicker-strand tassels – in gold for the chancellor and in silvery-white for the principal.

References

Mcgill
McGill University
Organizations based in Canada with royal patronage